Settimo Mineo (born 28 November 1938) is an Italian member of the Sicilian Mafia Pagliarelli mandamento from Palermo.

Biography 
Settimo Mineo, known as "Tonton Settimo", was born in Palermo in 1938. He officially owns a jewelry shop in the Palermo, but is considered the oldest boss of the Sicilian Mafia. In 1982, he escaped an ambush that cost the life of his brother Giuseppe, while in 1981 his brother Antonino was murdered. Testified against by pentito Tommaso Buscetta, he was sentenced to five years in prison in the Maxi Trial. After he was released from prison, he was then re-arrested in 2006 and sentenced in the "Gotha" trial. He was released in 2013 by decision of the Supreme Court of Cassation.

Despite being a former associate of Antonio Rotolo, a historical ally of the Corleonesi Mafia clan, in recent years Mineo made alliances with the cousins Franco and Tommaso Inzerillo, members of the Inzerillo Mafia clan and had as his right-hand man, Salvatore Sorrentino, all of them known rivals of Rotolo and of the Corleonesi, showing that Settimo Mineo had changed sides inside the Cosa Nostra.

On 29 May 2018, Mineo was elected the new head of the Sicilian Mafia Commission after the death of Salvatore Riina. On 4 December 2018, he was re-arrested in the operation "Cupola 2.0" conducted by the Carabinieri, on charges to be the new head of the "Dome" of Cosa Nostra.

According to investigators, after Mineo's arrest, he was replaced by Giuseppe Calvaruso as the new head of the Pagliarelli mandamento. Calvaruso was Settimo Mineo's most trusted man, and is known by his peculiar and very modern entrepreneurial attitude in managing the Pagliarelli mandamento.

Personal life 
Before his arrest, Mineo was known for his charisma and mediation skills; he did not use mobile phones for fear of being intercepted, also moving on foot, even to visit other Mafia bosses. Mineo and his wife would go to mass at the Church of San Giovanni Decollato in Ballarò, Palermo, and for a year even participated in a volunteer project of the church, involved in an after-school program for children at the church.

References

Gangsters from Palermo
Sicilian mafiosi
Italian crime bosses
Sicilian Mafia Commission
1938 births
Living people